Ubiquitin-like protein 5 is a protein that in humans is encoded by the UBL5 gene.

It has been shown that in C. elegans mitochondria treated to lower expression of certain electron transport chain proteins during the L3/L4 stage, its expression levels is higher leading to increased lifespans.

Ubiquitin-like proteins (UBLs) are thought to be reversible modulators of protein function rather than protein degraders like ubiquitin (MIM 191339).[supplied by OMIM]

References

Further reading

External links